Elizabeth Thynne, Viscountess Weymouth (c.1711 – 19 June 1729), formerly Lady Elizabeth Sackville, was the wife of Thomas Thynne, 2nd Viscount Weymouth.

Elizabeth was the eldest daughter of Lionel Sackville, 1st Duke of Dorset, and his wife Elizabeth.

At the age of four, Thynne had inherited Longleat House and its estates in addition to the viscountcy. Elizabeth married him on 6 December 1726 at Whitehall, London.

It was reported that the viscountess died "before cohabitation", although this was more than two years after their marriage; they had no children. At the time of her death, her husband was "on his travels". She was buried at Longbridge Deverill, Wiltshire, the traditional burial-place of the Thynne family.

Following her death, the viscount married again, his second wife being Lady Louisa Carteret.

References

1710s births
1729 deaths
Weymouth
Elizabeth
18th-century English nobility
18th-century English women
Daughters of British dukes
Burials in Wiltshire
Elizabeth